Anne Howard (March 18, 1925 – April 22, 1991), was an American actress.

Early life 
On March 18, 1925, Howard was born in Chicago, Illinois.

Career 
In 1929, Howard's film career started as a child actress. Her work included portraying Estella in Great Expectations (1934 film) (1934), a role for which she was chosen because she resembled Jane Wyatt, who portrayed the adult Estella.

Howard retired from acting in 1966, then became active in civic affairs.
Howard's last film was Prince of Darkness (1987).

Personal life 
Howard's husband was Leonard Caulfield. Howard's daughter is Vicki Caulfied. In 1980, Howard's husband died.
Howard's daughter Vicki married Lewis Snow.

On April 22, 1991, Howard died of a cerebral hemorrhage in Los Angeles, California. Howard was 66.

Filmography
1932: The Hatchet Man as Young girl (uncredited)
1934: Jane Eyre as Georgianna Reed (uncredited)
1934: She Was a Lady as Iris Vane
1934: Great Expectations as Estella, as a child
1934: Music in the Air as Elsa (uncredited)
1935: The Good Fairy as Child in Orphanage (uncredited)
1935: Princess O'Hara as Hannah O'Hara
1935: Navy Wife as Susan Harden
1936: Lady of Secrets as Child (uncredited)
1936: The King Steps Out as Child (uncredited)
1936: Anthony Adverse as Angela as a child (uncredited)
1936: Lloyd's of London as Catherine (uncredited)
1937: The Prince and the Pauper as Lady Jane Grey
1937: The Devil Is Driving as Miss Peters (uncredited)
1937: Love Is on the Air as brunette girl rooting for Curly (uncredited)
1940: All This, and Heaven Too as Isabelle Loullard (uncredited)
1940: Little Men as Daisy
1943: The Man from Down Under as Girl (uncredited)
1945: Her Highness and the Bellboy as Young Girl (uncredited)
1945: Kitty as Asses Milkmaid (uncredited)
1946: Tomorrow Is Forever as Girl Friend (uncredited)
1947: The Beginning or the End as English Laboratory Assistant (uncredited)
1948: Night Comes Too Soon as Phyllis
1951: The Company She Keeps as Stock Girl (uncredited)
1951: Lorna Doone as Annie Ridd (uncredited)

References

External links
 
 Allmovie Ann Howard, page

1925 births
1991 deaths
American film actresses
Actresses from Chicago
20th-century American actresses